Westermoen may refer to:

Thore Westermoen (born 1949), Norwegian politician for the Christian Democratic Party
Toralf Westermoen (1914–1986), pioneer for the development of high speed craft in Norway
Westermoen Båtbyggeri og Mek Verksted, shipyard located in Mandal, Norway, who specialized in high speed craft
Westermoen Hydrofoil, shipyard in Mandal, Norway, specialising in high speed craft